= Mała Niedźwiedzianka =

Location
- Country: Poland

Mała Niedźwiedzianka is a river of Poland, a tributary of the Niedźwiedzianka.
